Michelle Marie Shoda Belloso (born 1960) is a Venezuelan-American actress, businesswoman and beauty pageant titleholder.

Mother of businesswoman Isabel Cristina Homez Shoda (born 1986), marketing mogul Mariana Sofia Homez Shoda (born 1990), and Miami-based fashion stylist Alexandra Marie Homez Shoda (born 1992).

Miss Venezuela
Shoda grew up in Maracaibo and competed as Miss Falcón in Miss Venezuela 1982, becoming first runner up and gaining the right to represent Venezuela in the Miss World pageant held in London, United Kingdom on November 18, 1982.

References

External links
Miss Venezuela official website
Miss World official website

1960 births
Living people
People from Maracaibo
Actresses from New York City
Miss World 1982 delegates
Miss Venezuela World winners
American emigrants to Venezuela